Zarrko, the Tomorrow Man is a supervillain appearing in American comic books published by Marvel Comics. The character is most commonly associated with Thor.

Publication history

Zarrko was created by Stan Lee and Jack Kirby, and first appeared in Journey into Mystery #86 (November, 1962).

Fictional character biography
Zarrko is an evil scientist from the future, born in Old New York of the peaceful 23rd century of an alternate future. Zarrko was once a civil servant, but built a time machine to escape from his time and visit more primitive periods, like the United States in the 1960s, where nuclear weapons could be stolen easily, as he sought to become a conqueror and dictator in his own time. Zarrko stole an experimental cobalt bomb to use in his own time during its test, thus taking over the Earth which had no nuclear weapons, but was pursued by Thor using his hammer and a piece of metal from the ship to travel to Zarrko's time. Thor gained access to Zarrko's base after distracting the tyrant by getting someone to impersonate him, and defeated his robot servants even after they got his hammer. He recovered the bomb when Zarrko dropped it towards the Future City and caused Zarrko's ship to crash land using a storm he had summoned with his hammer.

Zarrko was left amnesiac for a time, but his memory was eventually restored by Loki using the Well of Centuries at a time when Thor had been de-powered; Zarrko returned to the 20th Century with a giant mining robot that he had adapted for his purposes and coerced Thor, whose lesser strength had caused him to be defeated by the robot, into helping him conquer the government of the 23rd Century, saying he would not attack Thor's century if this happened. They returned to the future, and Thor caused chaos, until he and Zarrko got to the ruling World Council. A robot octopus was released to attack the two, but Thor defeated it. Thor left a note to the Council advising them to let him take care of Zarrko himself. The location of the Master Machine (which ran this future world) was learnt from the Council and the two got there. Thor said he would help Zarrko enter the area if he would be released from his bargain, to which Zarrko agreed. Thor overcame a defense device's gravitational power. However, despite gaining access to the Master Machine, Thor, now released from his debt, then defeated him by turning the Master Machine's defense system back on. Zarrko was imprisoned and arrested by the guards soon after.

Zarrko later clashed with Kang when he tried to conquer Zarrko's 23rd century. Zarrko enlisted the aid of Spider-Man and Iron Man, as Kang had captured the other Avengers, to get inside Kang's base. Zarrko then sent three devices to the Present to de-evolve that era to pre-industrial times, except for an area containing an American missile base, from which he planned to steal nuclear weapons and rule the 23rd Century, but this was stopped by Spider-Man and the Human Torch. Spider-Man then returned to the 23rd Century with the Inhumans and defeated the two villains.

Zarrko later conquered an Earth in the 50th Century, where he encountered the Time-Twisters. He used his Servitor robot to enlist the aid of Thor and the Warriors Three to defeat the Time-Twisters. He journeyed with them to the "end of time" to thwart the Time-Twisters's birth, but when he returned to the 50th Century he found himself deposed as ruler.

Sometime later, Zarrko travelled to 2591 and tricked Dargo, the Thor of that era, into accompanying him to the 20th Century to battle the second Thor and Beta Ray Bill. Zarrko sought to use the energy unleashed by their hammers in the clash to activate the radical Time Stabilizer device to use to collapse all the timelines into one.  However, he has left adrift in the time-stream.

In one of the last story arcs of Thor vs Zarrko, Zarrko's plot was revealed to be a plan to save humanity. In his future, Thor had separated from his human self, Jake Olson, and lost his ability to understand humanity. Because of this, Thor became more and more oppressive and imposing, and believed that ruling humanity was the only just thing to do. Zarrko knew that in his future, Thor would become a tyrant, so he had to travel back in time and stop him before the Odin Force made him invincible and near-omnipotent.

When the Governments of Earth launched a massive assault on Asgard, Zarrko was seen trying to escape with his time machine, only to be stopped by Thialfi.

Zarrko's attempted time travel was instrumental for Thor to create for himself a new future in which he would never be the tyrant he would have been without his human self.

Zarrko later returned disguised as Boris, a manservant to Kristoff Vernard, the heir of Doctor Doom, who had become a member of the Fantastic Four following the "death" of Mister Fantastic. He was soon exposed but used his time machine to cause chaos in the building by bringing in various heroes and villains from the past and the future to fight it out. He later escaped, deciding that all he wanted was a quiet place and plenty of food.

As part of the Marvel NOW! brand, Zarrko popped up as a prisoner in S.H.I.E.L.D. custody after he dropped out of nowhere and was caught trying to steal some nuclear materials that were in S.H.I.E.L.D.'s possession. When the space-time continuum was broken due to the effects of the Age of Ultron storyline, a new division of S.H.I.E.L.D. was formed called T.I.M.E. to combat timestream-related threats. Zarkko was enlisted by T.I.M.E. to help Hulk fight a group of time-travel opportunists called the Chronarchists before they can modify history.

Skills and abilities
Artur Zarrko is a genius with advanced studies in various applied sciences of his futuristic time period.

Equipment
Zarrko has designed numerous devices, such as force field projectors, radiation guns, the Servitor (a giant robot with extraordinary strength that can discharge concussive blasts and release time missiles containing "chronal energy" which allegedly reverses the flow of time), the time-scope (a device able to peer through different timelines), the RTS (a power-absorbing device), a mining robot, and the Time Cube (a time machine).

Other versions

What If?
In an issue of What If? that asked the question "What If Jane Foster Found the Hammer of Thor," Zarrko is among the villains that fight Jane Foster's form of Thordis.

In other media

Television
 Zarrko appeared in "The Mighty Thor" portion of The Marvel Super Heroes. He is said to be from the 30th century.

References

Characters created by Jack Kirby
Characters created by Stan Lee
Comics characters introduced in 1962
Fictional civil servants
Fictional people from the 23rd-century
Marvel Comics male supervillains
Marvel Comics scientists
Marvel Comics supervillains
Thor (Marvel Comics)
Time travelers